Stolen Away is a Spanish thriller drama television series, produced by Atresmedia with the collaboration of Big Bang Media for broadcasting in Antena 3. Created by Natxo López, the series stars Daniel Grao, Carolina Lapausa, Melanie Olivares, Ana María Orozco, and Adriana Paz, among others. It follows Antonio (Grao), who travels to Bogotá to search for the man who years before kidnapped his daughter in Valencia. The series was pre-launched on streaming platform Atresplayer Premium on January 10, 2020. The series premiered on Antena 3 on January 14, 2020.

The series was also launched by Netflix in Spain, Portugal, and Latin America on June 5, 2020, and worldwide on October 23, 2020.

Cast 
 Daniel Grao as Antonio Santos Trénor
 Carolina Lapausa as Inma Rodríguez Colomer
 Melani Olivares as Eva Aguirre
 Fernando [El Flaco] Solórzano as Norberto Quitombo
 Juan Messier as Cruz Alfonso Ochoa
 Jon Arias as Sebastián Holguera
 Verónica Velásquez as Soledad Santos Rodríguez
 David Trejos as Ignacio
 Ana María Orozco as Milena Jiménez Mendoza
 Adriana Paz as Angelita Moreno Guerrero
 Steicy Gil as Daisy
 Jose Sospedra as Gerardo
 Camila Moreno as Camila Moreno 
 Mario Bolaños as Wilson

Episodes

References 

2020s Spanish drama television series
2020 Spanish television series debuts
2020 Spanish television series endings
Atresplayer Premium original programming
Spanish crime television series
Spanish prison television series
Television shows set in Bogotá
Television shows set in Spain